Dr. Salih Mahdi Motlab al-Hasnawi is an Iraqi doctor and politician, who has been the Minister of Health since 30 October 2007. He is a Shia Muslim, but independent of any political party.

He worked professionally as a mental health doctor and was a consultant psychiatrist and Director of Health for Karbala before being appointed to the post of Health Minister.

In January 2008 he reported the results of the "Iraq Family Health Survey" of 9,345 households across Iraq which was carried out in 2006 and 2007 for the World Health Organization and published in the New England Journal of Medicine. It estimated that there had been 151,000 deaths from violence (95% uncertainty range, 104,000 to 223,000) from March 2003 through June 2006.

Commenting on this survey, al-Hasnawi said "I believe in these numbers," and described the survey as "a very sound survey with accurate methodology" and said that it indicated "a massive death toll since the beginning of the conflict."
Al Hasnawi is the first Iraqi and Arabic physician to win the Presidential Medal of the Royal College of Psychiatrists, Edinburgh, 
for his vital role in the improvement of mental health in Iraq and the Middle East.
He also had the  Fellowship of the faculty of public health (UK) 2011 and a temporary adviser WHO - EMRO in mental health and research for health.

References

Year of birth missing (living people)
Living people
Government ministers of Iraq